In international relations, power is defined in several different ways. Material definitions of state power emphasize economic and military power. Other definitions of power emphasize the ability to structure and constitute the nature of social relations between actors. Power is an attribute of particular actors in their interactions, as well as a social process that constitutes the social identities and capacities of actors. 

International relations scholars use the term polarity to describe the distribution of power in the international system. Unipolarity refers to an international system characterized by one hegemon (e.g. United States in the post-Cold War period), bipolarity to an order with two great powers or blocs of states (e.g. the Cold War), and multipolarity refers to the presence of three or more great powers. Those states that have significant amounts of power within the international system are referred to as small powers, middle powers, regional powers, great powers, superpowers, or hegemons, although there is no commonly accepted standard for what defines a powerful state.

Entities other than states can have power in international relations. Such entities can include multilateral international organizations, military alliance organizations like NATO, multinational corporations like Wal-Mart, non-governmental organizations such as the Roman Catholic Church, or other institutions such as the Hanseatic League and technology companies like Facebook and Google.

Concepts of political power 
Michael Barnett and Raymond Duvall define power as "the production, in and through social relations, of effects that shape the capacities of actors to determine their circumstances and fate." They reject definitions of power that conflate power as any and all effects because doing so makes power synonymous with causality. They also reject persuasion as part of the definition of power, as it revolves around actors freely and voluntarily changing their minds once presented with new information.

Political scientists, historians, and practitioners of international relations (diplomats) have used the following concepts of political power:
 Power as a goal of states or leaders;
 Power as a measure of influence or control over outcomes, events, actors and issues;
 Power as victory in conflict and the attainment of security;
 Power as control over resources and capabilities;
 Power as status, which some states or actors possess and others do not.

Power as a goal
The primary usage of "power" as a goal in international relations belongs to political theorists, such as Niccolò Machiavelli and Hans Morgenthau.  Especially among Classical Realist thinkers, power is an inherent goal of mankind and of states.  Economic growth, military growth, cultural spread etc. can all be considered as working towards the ultimate goal of international power.  The German military thinker Carl von Clausewitz is considered to be the quintessential projection of European growth across the continent.  In more modern times, Claus Moser has elucidated theories centre of distribution of power in Europe after the Holocaust, and the power of universal learning as its counterpoint. Jean Monnet was a French left-wing social theorist, stimulating expansive Eurocommunism, who followed on the creator of modern European community, the diplomat and statesman Robert Schuman.

Power as influence

Political scientists principally use "power" in terms of an actor's ability to exercise influence over other actors within the international system. This influence can be coercive, attractive, cooperative, or competitive. Mechanisms of influence can include the threat or use of force, economic interaction or pressure, diplomacy, and cultural exchange.

Under certain circumstances, states can organize a sphere of influence or a bloc within which they exercise predominant influence. Historical examples include the spheres of influence recognized under the Concert of Europe, or the recognition of spheres during the Cold War following the Yalta Conference. The Eastern Bloc, the Western Bloc, and the Non-Aligned Movement were the blocs that arose out of the Cold War contest. Military alliances like NATO and the Warsaw Pact are another forum through which influence is exercised. However, "realist" theory attempted to maintain the balance of power from the development of meaningful diplomatic relations that can create a hegemony within the region. British foreign policy, for example, dominated Europe through the Congress of Vienna after the defeat of France.  They continued the balancing act with the Congress of Berlin in 1878, to appease Russia and Germany from attacking Turkey.  Britain has sided against the aggressors on the European continent—i.e. the German Empire, Nazi Germany, Napoleonic France or the Austrian Empire, known during the Great War as the Central Powers and, in World War II as the Axis Powers.

International orders have both a material and social component. Martha Finnemore argues that unipolarity does not just entail a material superiority by the unipole, but also a social structure whereby the unipole maintains its status through legitimation, and institutionalization. In trying to obtain legitimacy from the other actors in the international system, the unipole necessarily gives those actors a degree of power. The unipole also obtains legitimacy and wards off challenges to its power through the creation of institutions, but these institutions also entail a diffusion of power away from the unipole. David Lake has argued along similar lines that legitimacy and authority are key components of international order.

Susan Strange made a key contribution to International Political Economy on the issue of power, which she considered essential to the character and dynamics of the global economy. Strange was skeptical of static indicators of power, arguing that it was structural power that mattered. In particular, interactions between states and markets mattered. She pointed to the superiority of the American technology sector, dominance in services, and the position of the U.S. dollar as the top international currency as real indicators of lasting power. She distinguished between relational power (the power to compel A to get B to do something B does not want to do) and structural power (the power to shape and determine the structure of the global political economy). Political scientists Henry Farrell and Abraham L. Newman argue that state power is in part derived from control over important nodes in global networks of informational and financial exchange, which means that states can "weaponize interdependence" by fighting over control of these nodes.

Power as security
Power is also used when describing states or actors that have achieved military victories or security for their state in the international system. This general usage is most commonly found among the writings of historians or popular writers.

Power as capability
American author Charles W. Freeman, Jr. described power as the following:

Power is also used to describe the resources and capabilities of a state. This definition is quantitative and is most often used by geopoliticians and the military. Capabilities are thought of in tangible terms—they are measurable, weighable, quantifiable assets. A good example for this kind of measurement is the Composite Indicator on Aggregate Power, which involves 54 indicators and covers the capabilities of 44 states in Asia-Pacific from 1992 to 2012. Hard power can be treated as a potential and is not often enforced on the international stage.

Chinese strategists have such a concept of national power that can be measured quantitatively using an index known as comprehensive national power.

Michael Beckley argues that gross domestic product and military spending are imprecise indicators of power. He argues that better measurements of power should take into account "net" indicators of powers: "[Gross] indicators systematically exaggerate the wealth and military capabilities of poor, populous countries, because they tally countries’ resources without deducting the costs countries pay to police, protect, and serve their people. A country with a big population might produce vast output and field a large army, but it also may bear massive welfare and security burdens that drain its wealth and bog down its military, leaving it with few resources for power projection abroad."

Power as status

Definitions
Much effort in academic and popular writing is devoted to deciding which countries have the status of "power", and how this can be measured. If a country has "power" (as influence) in military, diplomatic, cultural, and economic spheres, it might be called a "power" (as status). There are several categories of power, and inclusion of a state in one category or another is fraught with difficulty and controversy. In his famous 1987 work, The Rise and Fall of the Great Powers, British-American historian Paul Kennedy charts the relative status of the various powers from AD 1500 to 2000. He does not begin the book with a theoretical definition of "great power"; however he lists them, separately, for many different eras. Moreover, he uses different working definitions of great power for different eras. For example;
Neorealist scholars frequently define power as entailing military capabilities and economic strength. Classical realists recognized that the ability to influence depended on psychological relationships that touched on ethical principles, legitimacy and justice, as well as emotions, leaders' skill and power over opinion.

Categories of power

In the modern geopolitical landscape, a number of terms are used to describe various types of powers, which include the following:
 Superpower: In 1944, William T. R. Fox defined superpower as "great power plus great mobility of power" and identified three states, the British Empire, the Soviet Union and the United States. With the decolonisation of the British Empire following World War II, and then the dissolution of the Soviet Union in 1991, the United States has remained to be the sole superpower. China is now considered an emerging global superpower by many scholars.
 Great power: In historical mentions, the term great power refers to the states that have strong political, cultural and economical influence over nations around them and across the world.
 Middle power: A subjective description of influential second-tier states that could not quite be described as great or small powers. A middle power has sufficient strength and authority to stand on its own without the need of help from others (particularly in the realm of security) and takes diplomatic leads in regional and global affairs. Clearly not all middle powers are of equal status; some are members of forums such as the G20 and play important roles in the United Nations and other international organisations such as the WTO.
 Small power: The International System is for the most part made up by small powers. They are instruments of the other powers and may at times be dominated; but they cannot be ignored.

Other categories
 Regional power: This term is used to describe a nation that exercises influence and power within a region. Being a regional power is not mutually exclusive with any of the other categories of power. The majority of them exert a strategic degree of influence as minor or secondary regional powers. A primary regional power (like Australia) has an often important role in international affairs outside of its region too.
 Cultural superpower: Refers to a country whose culture, arts or entertainment have worldwide appeal, significant international popularity or large influence on much of the world. Countries such as China, India, Italy, Japan, Spain, France, the United Kingdom, the United States, Jamaica, and South Korea have often been described as cultural superpowers, although it is sometimes debated on which criteria this is determined. Unlike traditional forms of national power, the term cultural superpower is in reference to a nation's soft power capabilities.
 Energy superpower: Describes a country that supplies large amounts of energy resources (crude oil, natural gas, coal, uranium, etc.) to a significant number of other states, and therefore has the potential to influence world markets to gain a political or economic advantage. Saudi Arabia and Russia are generally acknowledged as the world's current energy superpowers, given their abilities to globally influence or even directly control prices to certain countries. Australia and Canada are potential energy superpowers due to their large natural resources.

Hard, soft and smart power

Some political scientists distinguish between two types of power: Hard and Soft. The former is coercive (example: military invasion) while the latter is attractive (example: broadcast media or cultural invasion).

Hard power refers to coercive tactics: the threat or use of armed forces, economic pressure or sanctions, assassination and subterfuge, or other forms of intimidation. Hard power is generally associated to the stronger of nations, as the ability to change the domestic affairs of other nations through military threats. Realists and neorealists, such as John Mearsheimer, are advocates of the use of such power for the balancing of the international system.

Joseph Nye is the leading proponent and theorist of soft power. Instruments of soft power include debates on cultural values, dialogues on ideology, the attempt to influence through good example, and the appeal to commonly accepted human values. Means of exercising soft power include diplomacy, dissemination of information, analysis, propaganda, and cultural programming to achieve political ends.

Others have synthesized soft and hard power, including through the field of smart power. This is often a call to use a holistic spectrum of statecraft tools, ranging from soft to hard.

See also 
 Balance of power (international relations)
 Global policeman 
 International relations (1814–1919)
 National power
 Peace through strength
 Power Politics
 Power (social and political)
 Power transition theory

References

Further reading 
 Bennett, Andrew (2013). "The mother of all isms: Causal mechanisms and structured pluralism in International Relations theory." European Journal of International Relations.
 Barnett, Michael; Duvall, Raymond (2005). "Power in International Politics". International Organization 59 (1): 39–75.

 
Geopolitical rivalry
Political history